James Cushing may refer to:
 James M. Cushing (1908–1963), US Army mining engineer 
 James T. Cushing (1937–2002), American physicist and philosopher of science
 Jim Cushing, American DJ at KCPR